Bald Mountain is a summit in the U.S. state of Georgia.

Bald Mountain was so named on account of its treeless apex. A variant name is Big Bald Mountain.

References

Mountains of Murray County, Georgia
Mountains of Georgia (U.S. state)